John Panton was a golfer.

John Panton may also refer to:

John Panton (MP), Welsh politician
John Panton (Australian politician), merchant and politician in New South Wales and Queensland, Australia